James Lincoln may refer to:
 James Lincoln (athlete) (1889–1952), American track and field athlete
 James Lincoln (cricketer) (born 1981), English cricketer
 James H. Lincoln (1916–2011), Detroit City councilman, judge, and author
 James Sullivan Lincoln (1811–1888), American portrait painter
 Paul Lincoln (James McDonald Lincoln, 1921–2011), Australian professional wrestler